Sir Michael Hardie Boys,  (born 6 October 1931) is a New Zealand retired lawyer, judge, and jurist who served as the 17th Governor-General of New Zealand, in office from 1996 to 2001.

Early life and family
Hardie Boys was born in 1931 in Wellington. His father was the Hon Reginald Hardie Boys (1903–1970), a judge of the Supreme Court. After his schooling at Hataitai School and Wellington College, Hardie Boys gained a Bachelor of Arts and Bachelor of Laws from Victoria University College. Hardie Boys married Mary Zohrab in 1957. They have two sons, two daughters and eight grandchildren.

Judge of the High Court

A lawyer by profession, Hardie Boys became a Judge of the High Court of New Zealand in 1980 (prior to 1980, the name was Supreme Court, i.e. he sat in the same court that his father had). In 1989 he was elevated to the Court of Appeal, and was appointed as a Privy Counsellor. In 1994 he was elected as an Honorary Bencher at Gray's Inn, and in 1995 became an Honorary Fellow of Wolfson College, Cambridge. He is also a visiting fellow at Wolfson. In the 1996 New Year Honours, Hardie Boys was appointed as a Knight Grand Cross of the Order of St Michael and St George.

Governor-General of New Zealand

On 21 March 1996, Hardie Boys was appointed by Queen Elizabeth II, Queen of New Zealand on the advice of Prime Minister Jim Bolger, as the Governor-General of New Zealand. As the 1996 New Zealand general election would be the first MMP election, the appointment of a lawyer was desirable.

In the 1996 Queen's Birthday Honours, Hardie Boys was the first person appointed as a Knight Grand Companion of the New Zealand Order of Merit. He was also appointed a Knight of the Order of St John of Jerusalem in April 1996.

Upon the completion of his term on 21 March 2001, Sir Michael and Lady Hardie Boys were both appointed as additional Companions of the Queen's Service Order.

Controversies

In 1996, Hardie Boys caused controversy by stating his opposition to Minister of Youth Affairs Deborah Morris's suggestion that young people have access to contraceptives. Later, in 2001, he created further controversy by making an implied attack on the Clark Labour Government's scrapping of the air defence wing of the Royal New Zealand Air Force.

Retirement
After his retirement as Governor-General of New Zealand, Hardie Boys served as a judge of the Kiribati Court of Appeal. He now lives in retirement at Waikanae.

In 2004, Hardie Boys stated his opposition to New Zealand becoming a republic, stating in an interview: "If it ain't broke, don't fix it."

Arms

Further reading
The Boy from Evans Bay: The memoirs of Sir Michael Hardie Boys (2016)

References

External links
Official biography

1931 births
Living people
Court of Appeal of New Zealand judges
Fellows of Wolfson College, Cambridge
People educated at Wellington College (New Zealand)
Governors-General of New Zealand
High Court of New Zealand judges
New Zealand judges on the courts of Kiribati
New Zealand Knights Grand Cross of the Order of St Michael and St George
People from Waikanae
Members of the Judicial Committee of the Privy Council
New Zealand monarchists
Victoria University of Wellington alumni
Knights Grand Companion of the New Zealand Order of Merit
Companions of the Queen's Service Order
Knights of Justice of the Order of St John
New Zealand members of the Privy Council of the United Kingdom
People from Wellington City
20th-century New Zealand lawyers
20th-century New Zealand judges
21st-century New Zealand judges